Dhilwan is a town and a nagar panchayat in Kapurthala district in the state of Punjab, India.

History

In 1987 Lalru bus massacre 38 Hindu bus passengers going from Dhilwan to Jalandhar were killed by pro-Khalistan Sikh militants at Lalru.

Geography
It has an average elevation of 219 metres (718 feet).

Dhilwan Kalan
Dhilwan and Dhilwan Kalan in Sikh History Books are two different places. Dhilwan Kalan is also written as Dhilwan, or Dhilwan Sodhian, which causes confusion among readers. Dhilwan Kalan is near Kotkapura in Faridkot district. A few other villages have identical or similar names, Dhilwan Khurd (Faridkot district), Dhilwan Wala (Moga district), Dhilwan (Barnala district), Dhilwan (Gurdaspur district).

Demographics
 India census, Dhilwan had a population of 7980. Males constituted 52% of the population and females 48%. Dhilwan has an average literacy rate of 68%, higher than the national average of 59.5%: male literacy is 72% and female literacy is 63%. In Dhilwan, 12% of the population is under 6 years of age.

Transport
By Air: Dhilwan is located at 65 km far from Amritsar International airport, (Raja Sansi Airport)
By Rail: Dhilwan railway station is located at 3 km far from main city 
By Road: Dhilwan is well connected to all major towns and cities of the state
Bus Route: PRTC - Pepsu Road Transport Corporation provides regular buses to reach inter-city and inter-state regions.

References

Cities and towns in Kapurthala district